Anna Luna was an afternoon Philippine soap opera which aired on ABS-CBN from November 27, 1989 to September 30, 1994. The series was the longest Philippine drama series on ABS-CBN until 2022 when FPJ's Ang Probinsyano surpassed it. Anna Luna was transferred to RPN from October 3, 1994 to September 29, 1995. Anna Luna made a comeback during the glory days of Philippine drama and became a contemporary for some other series like Mara Clara, Agila and Valiente.

Plot
Separated from her mother after an accident at sea, Anna Luna is forced to live in the city with her estranged grandmother, Doña Martina Dominguez.

Anna Luna is unwanted in the Dominguez mansion. To the old woman, she is a constant reminder of her daughter's disobedience by marrying a poor man. To a greedy aunt and an irksome cousin, she is a threat to the inheritance.

Cast and characters

Main cast
 Margarita Fuentes as Anna Luna D. Tecson / Anna Luna D. Corpuz
 Ricky Belmonte as Arnulfo Corpuz
 Melissa Mendez as Emily Dominguez-Tecson / Pilar

Supporting cast
 Suzanne Gonzales as Elvira Dominguez
 Charmi Benavidez as Claire Corpuz
 Joanne Miller as Eunice Corpuz
 Wilma Dela Rosa as Aleli Corpuz
 Lorraine Schuck as Lourdes Dominguez
 Dennis Baltazar as Erwin Dominguez
 Hugo Linsangan as Joey
 Victor Neri as Edmond
 Gloria "Mona Lisa" Yatco as Doña Martina Dominguez
 Metring David as Cita
 Vangie Labalan as Tarsing
 Ronnie Lazaro as Pinong
 Errol Dionisio
 Sylvia Sanchez
 Tita de Villa
 Jessa Zaragoza
 Beverly Vergel
 Perla Bautista

Production
Judy Ann Santos was first offered to play the titular role but she was chosen to portray the main role of soap opera Ula, Ang Batang Gubat. The production later conducted an audition and chose Margarita Fuentes to portray Anna Luna.

Timeslot
Anna Luna aired on ABS-CBN from November 27, 1989 to September 30, 1994, from 2:00 pm until 2:30 pm. Then it aired on RPN from October 3, 1994 to September 29, 1995

Controversy
In 1994, Jose Mari Gonzales, the president of RPN at that time, was accused by ABS-CBN of copyright infringement on this soap opera. He believed that Anna Luna was the intellectual property of Zenaida O. Soriano, the wife of Anna Liza director Gil Soriano. Gonzales also believed that ABS-CBN only acquired Soriano to line-produce the series and that the network attempted to buy its airing rights but the production company behind Anna Luna refused which led to its removal. However, RPN continued to air Anna Luna, with a new title Hanggang Kailan, Anna Luna?: Ikalawang Aklat (English title: Anna Luna, Until when?: Second Book) to become part of the network's relaunch on October 3, 1994. The series ended on September 29, 1995, after a year of broadcast on RPN, and almost 6 years on the air.

Award
 PMPC Star Awards for TV's Best New TV Personality (1990) – Margarita Fuentes

See also
List of programs broadcast by ABS-CBN
List of programs previously broadcast by Radio Philippines Network

References

External links
 

ABS-CBN drama series
1980s Philippine television series
1990s Philippine television series
1989 Philippine television series debuts
1995 Philippine television series endings
Filipino-language television shows
ABS-CBN original programming
Radio Philippines Network original programming
Television shows set in the Philippines